The Ian Charleson Awards are theatrical awards that reward the best classical stage performances in Britain by actors under age 30. The awards are named in memory of the renowned British actor Ian Charleson, and are run by the Sunday Times newspaper and the National Theatre. The awards were established in 1990 after Charleson's death, and have been awarded annually since then. Sunday Times theatre critic John Peter (1938–2020) initiated the creation of the awards, particularly in memory of Charleson's extraordinary Hamlet, which he had performed shortly before his death. Recipients receive a cash prize, as do runners-up and third-place winners.

The awards' current definition of a classical play is one written before 1918. The awards for the previous year's performances are presented the following year. The shortlist nominations for 2019 were announced in May 2020, but the awards ceremony was postponed due to the COVID-19 pandemic;  a digital ceremony was held in March 2021 and the winner was Heledd Gwynn. The pandemic-delayed shortlist nominations for 2020 were announced 27 March 2022; at the awards ceremony on 16 May 2022, Gloria Obianyo won first prize.

Background and description
The Sunday Times chief drama critic John Peter saw and reviewed Ian Charleson's extraordinary Hamlet at the National Theatre in late 1989. Unbeknownst to the audience, Charleson performed it during the last weeks of his life while he was seriously ill with AIDS, and died in January 1990 at the age of 40 eight weeks after his final performance. In November 1990, in memory of Charleson's fine performance, Peter established the annual Ian Charleson Award, to recognize and reward the best classical stage performance by an actor under age 30. The awards are jointly sponsored by The Sunday Times and the National Theatre, where they are held.

Upon founding the awards, Peter noted:

The first annual Ian Charleson Award was presented in January 1991. The awards initially defined a classic play as one written prior to 1900; by the awards for 1992 this parameter had been extended to plays written by 1904, the year of Chekhov's death; this cut-off was extended to 1918 at the awards for 2008. The awards are presented at a friendly, low-key private luncheon at one of the restaurants at the National Theatre. There is no filming and no outside press, and there are no acceptance speeches; the awards are attended however by Britain's theatre royalty, who take great interest in preserving the foundations of their profession. Guests of honour have included Alec Guinness, Paul Scofield, Ian McKellen, and Prince Charles.

Recipients receive a cash prize, as do runners-up and third-place winners. All shortlist nominees who are not cash-prize recipients receive a "commendation". Winners and commendees receive a plaque signed by the judges, who usually number four (a theatre critic, an actor, a casting director, and an artistic director) and until the awards for 2016 always included John Peter.

The awards for the previous year's performances are presented the following year, generally in the spring. The prize money is as follows: 1st prize £5,000; 2nd prize £1,500 (sometimes £2,000 or £2,500); and 3rd prize £500.

1990s

1990

First prize
Ian Hughes, for Torquato Tasso in Torquato Tasso (Actors Touring Company)

Second prize
Paterson Joseph, for Oswald in King Lear, Dumaine in Love's Labour's Lost, and the Marquis de Mota in The Last Days of Don Juan (Royal Shakespeare Company)

Special commendation
Simon Russell Beale, for Konstantin in The Seagull, Thersites in Troilus and Cressida, and Edward II in Edward II (Royal Shakespeare Company)

Commendation
Saskia Wickham, for Sonya in Uncle Vanya (Old Vic Theatre)

1991

First prize
Joe Dixon, for Jacques in an all-male production of As You Like It (Cheek by Jowl)

Second prize
Jennifer Ehle, for Orgon's wife in Tartuffe (Peter Hall Company)

Special commendation
Iain Glen, for Hamlet in Hamlet (Old Vic, Bristol)

Commendations
Adrian Lester, for Rosalind in an all-male production of As You Like It (Cheek by Jowl)
Tom Hollander, for Celia in an all-male production of As You Like It (Cheek by Jowl)
Hugh Bonneville (then known as Richard Bonneville), for Sir Samuel Hearty in The Virtuoso, Valentine in The Two Gentlemen of Verona, Bergetto in 'Tis Pity She's a Whore, and Kastril in The Alchemist (Royal Shakespeare Company)
Caroline Quentin, for Masha in The Seagull (Oxford Theatre Company)

1992

First prize
Tom Hollander, for Witwoud in The Way of the World (Lyric Hammersmith)

Second prize
Toby Stephens, for Bertram in All's Well That Ends Well (Swan Theatre)

Special commendation
Ian Hughes, for Reynaldo and Fortinbras in Hamlet (Barbican Theatre)

Commendations
Mabel Aitken, for Sonia in Uncle Vanya (Lyceum Theatre, Edinburgh)
Sophie Thursfield, for Nora in A Doll's House (Duke of Cambridge pub theatre, London)
Nick Waring, for Konstantin in The Seagull (Theatr Clwyd)

1993

First prize
Emma Fielding, for Agnes in The School for Wives (Almeida Theatre)

Second prize
Mark Lockyer, for Stephano in The Tempest, Oswald in King Lear, and 'Gratiano in 'The Merchant of Venice (Royal Shakespeare Company)

Third prize
Helen McCrory, for Rose Trelawny in Trelawny of the 'Wells' (National Theatre)

Commendations
Adrian Scarborough, for Dromio of Syracuse in The Comedy of Errors (Royal Exchange Theatre, Manchester)
Michael Sheen, for Perdican in Don't Fool With Love (Cheek by Jowl)
Helen Baxendale for Marie Wesener in The Soldiers (Citizens Theatre, Glasgow)

1994
First prize
Toby Stephens, for Coriolanus in Coriolanus (Royal Shakespeare Company)

Second prize
Anastasia Hille, for Isabella in Measure For Measure (Cheek by Jowl)

Third prize
Jude Law, for Ion in Ion (Royal Shakespeare Company)

Commendations
Henry Ian Cusick, for Creon and The Messenger in Oedipus Rex (Citizens Theatre, Glasgow) and Torquato Tasso in Torquato Tasso (Royal Lyceum Theatre, Edinburgh)
Marianne Jean-Baptiste, for Mistress Overdone and Mariana in Measure For Measure (Cheek by Jowl) 
Mark Bazeley, for Lucio in Measure For Measure (Cheek by Jowl) 
Guy Lankester, for Orsino in Twelfth Night (Bristol Old Vic)

1995
First prize
Lucy Whybrow, for Eleanora in Easter (Royal Shakespeare Company)

Second prize
Victoria Hamilton, for Hilde Wangel in The Master Builder (Peter Hall Company)

Third prize
Catherine Russell, for Masha in Three Sisters (Out of Joint)

Commendations
Paul Bettany, for Strato in Julius Caesar (Royal Shakespeare Company)
Zubin Varla, for Romeo in Romeo and Juliet (Royal Shakespeare Company)
Rakie Ayola, for Millamant in The Way of the World (Birmingham Rep)
Alexandra Gilbreath, for Regan in King Lear (West Yorkshire Playhouse)
John Light, for Philippe D'Aulnay in The Tower (Almeida Theatre)
Julian Rhind-Tutt, for the Duke of Aumerle in Richard II (National Theatre)
Benedick Bates, for Don Carlos in Don Carlos (Citizens Theatre, Glasgow)

1996
First prize
Alexandra Gilbreath, for Hedda in Hedda Gabler (English Touring Theatre)

Second prize
Derbhle Crotty, for Asta in Little Eyolf (Royal Shakespeare Company)

Third prize
Damian Lewis, for Borghejm in Little Eyolf (Royal Shakespeare Company)

Special commendation
Tom Hollander, for Tartuffe in Tartuffe (Almeida Theatre)

Commendations
Ian Pepperell, for Hamlet in Hamlet (Oxford Stage Company)
Carol Starks, for Mrs. Elvsted in Hedda Gabler (English Touring Theatre)
Rebecca Johnson, for Lady Windermere in Lady Windermere's Fan (Royal Exchange Theatre, Manchester; Theatre Royal, Haymarket)
Scott Handy, for Ferdinand in The Duchess of Malfi (Cheek by Jowl)

1997
First prize
Mark Bazeley, for Konstantin in The Seagull (English Touring Theatre) (tie)
Dominic West, for Konstantin in The Seagull (Peter Hall Company, Old Vic Theatre) (tie)

Second prize
James Dreyfus, for Cassius in Julius Caesar (Birmingham Repertory Theatre)

Special commendations
Michael Sheen, for Henry V in Henry V (Royal Shakespeare Company)
Tom Hollander, for Khlestakov in The Government Inspector (Almeida Theatre)

Commendations
Kate Ashfield, for Marie in Woyzeck (Gate Theatre)
Toby Cockerell, for Katherine and the Boy in Henry V (Shakespeare's Globe)
Dominic Curtis, for Orlando in As You Like It (Perth Theatre)
Anne-Marie Duff, for Cordelia in King Lear (National Theatre)
Ray Fearon, for Romeo in Romeo and Juliet (Royal Shakespeare Company)
Zoe Waites, for Juliet in Romeo and Juliet (Royal Shakespeare Company)
Victoria Hamilton, for Lady Brute in The Provok'd Wife (Peter Hall Company)
Andrew Howard, for Orestes in Electra (Minerva Theatre, Chichester; Donmar Warehouse)
Jason Hughes, for Pleribo, Adraste, and Prince Florilame in The Illusion (Royal Exchange Theatre, Manchester)
Julia Sawalha, for Melibea, Isabelle, and Hippolyta in The Illusion (Royal Exchange Theatre, Manchester)
Paul McEneany, for Mustardseed and Flute in A Midsummer Night's Dream (Lyric Theatre, Belfast)
Lise Stevenson, for Isabella in Measure for Measure (Nottingham Playhouse)

1998
First prize
Claudie Blakley, for Nina in The Seagull (West Yorkshire Playhouse)

Second prize
Kevin McKidd, for Britannicus in Britannicus (Almeida Theatre)

Third prize
Paul Hilton, for Orlando in As You Like It (Shakespeare's Globe)

Commendations
Kathy Kiera Clarke, for Medea in Medea (Citizens Theatre, Glasgow)
Hermione Gulliford, for Olivia in Twelfth Night (Crucible Theatre, Sheffield)
Thusitha Jayasundera, for Viola in Twelfth Night (Young Vic)
Susan Lynch, for Katerina in The Storm (Almeida Theatre)
Stephen Mangan, for Don Pedro in Much Ado About Nothing (Cheek by Jowl), and Sir Benjamin Backbite in The School for Scandal (Royal Shakespeare Company)
Matthew Macfadyen, for Benedick in Much Ado About Nothing (Cheek by Jowl), and Charles Surface in The School for Scandal (Royal Shakespeare Company)
Jo McInnes, for Sonya in Uncle Vanya (Royal Shakespeare Company)
David Oyelowo, for the King in The Suppliants (Gate Theatre)
Kelly Reilly, for Peggy Riley in The London Cuckolds (National Theatre)

1999
First prize
Rupert Penry-Jones, for Don Carlos in Don Carlos (Royal Shakespeare Company)

Second prize
Gabrielle Jourdan, for Jessica in The Merchant of Venice (National Theatre)

Third prize
Megan Dodds, for Ophelia in Hamlet (Young Vic)

Commendations
Ariyon Bakare, for Florindo in The Servant of Two Masters (Royal Shakespeare Company, Young Vic)
Emma Cunniffe, for Hilde in The Master Builder (English Touring Theatre)
Jude Law, for Giovanni in 'Tis Pity She's a Whore (Young Vic)
Aidan McArdle, for Rodrigo in Othello, and Puck in A Midsummer Night's Dream (Royal Shakespeare Company)
Patrick Moy, for Malcolm in Macbeth (Royal Lyceum Theatre, Edinburgh)
Kirsten Parker, for Viola in Twelfth Night (Theatr Clwyd)
Claire Price, for Princess Eboli in Don Carlos (Royal Shakespeare Company)
Iain Robertson, for Adam/Isaac/Shepherd in The Mysteries (National Theatre)

2000s

2000
First prize
David Oyelowo, for Henry VI in Henry VI (Royal Shakespeare Company)

Second prize
John Light, for Konstantin in The Seagull (Royal Shakespeare Company)

Third prize
Zoe Waites, for Vittoria in The White Devil (Lyric Hammersmith)

Commendations
Nancy Carroll, for Lady Percy in Henry VI, Part 1 (Royal Shakespeare Company)
James O'Donnell, for Page and Ostler in Henry VI (Royal Shakespeare Company) 
Joe Renton, for Peto in Henry VI (Royal Shakespeare Company)
Chiwetel Ejiofor, for Romeo in Romeo and Juliet (National Theatre)
Martin Hutson, for Silvius in As You Like It (Crucible Theatre, Sheffield)
Molly Innes, for Electra in Electra (Theatre Babel)
Justine Waddell, for Nina in The Seagull (Royal Shakespeare Company)
David Tennant, for Antipholus of Syracuse in The Comedy of Errors (RSC)
Sam Troughton, for Young Talbot in Henry VI, Part 1 (Royal Shakespeare Company)

2001
First prize
Claire Price, for Berinthia in The Relapse (National Theatre)

Second prize
Zoe Waites, for Viola in Twelfth Night (Royal Shakespeare Company)

Third prize
James D'Arcy, for Gaveston in Edward II (Crucible Theatre, Sheffield)

Commendations
Claire Cox, for Portia in Julius Caesar (Royal Shakespeare Company)
Benedict Cumberbatch, for the King of Navarre in Love's Labour's Lost (Regent's Park Open Air Theatre)
August Diehl, for Konstantin The Seagull (Edinburgh Festival)
John Hopkins, for Octavius in Julius Caesar (Royal Shakespeare Company)
Johanna Wokalek, for Nina in The Seagull (Edinburgh Festival)
Martin Hutson, for Oswald in Ghosts (Comedy Theatre)
Gerald Kyd, for the King of Bavarre in Love's Labour's Lost (English Touring Theatre) 
Kevin Lennon, for Giovanni in 'Tis Pity She's a Whore (Theatre Babel, Glasgow)
Kirsten Parker, for the Princess in Love's Labour's Lost (English Touring Theatre)
Sam Troughton, for Richmond in Richard III (Royal Shakespeare Company)
Zubin Varla, for Caliban in The Tempest (Royal Shakespeare Company)
Kaye Wragg, for Sonya in Uncle Vanya (Royal Exchange Theatre, Manchester)

2002
First prize
Rebecca Hall, for Vivvie in Mrs Warren's Profession (Strand Theatre)Lathan, P. "Another Hall Hits the Heights"  The British Theatre Guide, April 20, 2003, retrieved November 9, 2006.

Second prize
Daniel Evans, for Ariel in The Tempest (Crucible Theatre, Sheffield) and Oswald in Ghosts (English Touring Theatre)

Third prize
Iain Robertson, for Trinculo in The Tempest (Crucible Theatre, Sheffield)

Commendations
Nonso Anozie, for King Lear in King Lear (Royal Shakespeare Company)
Justin Avoth, for Demetrius in A Midsummer Night's Dream (Royal Exchange Theatre, Manchester)
Lucy Black, for Olivia in Twelfth Night (Shakespeare at the Tobacco Factory, Bristol)
Nancy Carroll, for Cordelia in King Lear (Almeida Theatre)
Dan Fredenburgh, for the Prince in The Prince of Homburg (Royal Shakespeare Company)
Naomi Frederick, for Irina in Three Sisters (Nuffield Theatre, Southampton) 
Ryan Kiggell, for Gloucester in King Lear (Royal Shakespeare Company) 
Kananu Kirimi, for Marina in Pericles (Royal Shakespeare Company)
Claire Price, for Miranda in The Tempest (Crucible Theatre, Sheffield)
Sam Troughton, for Valère in Tartuffe (National Theatre)

2003
First prize
Lisa Dillon, for Hilda Wangel in The Master Builder (Almeida Theatre)Paddock, Terri. "Dillon Wins Ian Charleson Award for Master Builder". What's On Stage. 29 March 2004.

Second prize
Louisa Clein, for Hilde in The Lady from the Sea (Almeida Theatre)

Third prize
Eve Myles, for Lavinia in Titus Andronicus and Bianca in The Taming of the Shrew (Royal Shakespeare Company)

Special commendations
Rebecca Hall, for Rosalind in As You Like It (Peter Hall Company)
Felicite du Jeu, for Katherine in Henry V (National Theatre)

Commendations
Jamie Beamish, for Sir Thurio in Two Gentlemen of Verona (Regent's Park Open Air Theatre)
Kellie Bright, for Masha in The Seagull (Royal Exchange Theatre)
Nancy Carroll, for Helena in A Midsummer Night’s Dream (Crucible Theatre, Sheffield)
Rory Kinnear, for Tranio in The Taming of the Shrew (Royal Shakespeare Company) 
Emma Lowndes, for Nina in The Seagull (Royal Exchange Theatre, Manchester)
Tobias Menzies, for Tusenbach in Three Sisters (Playhouse Theatre)
Joseph Millson, for Orlando in As You Like It (Peter Hall Company)
Paul Ready, for Dromio of Syracuse in The Comedy of Errors (Bristol Old Vic)
Steven Robertson, for Konstantin in The Seagull (Royal Exchange Theatre, Manchester)

2004
First prize
Nonso Anozie, for Othello in Othello (Cheek by Jowl)

Second prize
Naomi Frederick, for Isabella in Measure for Measure (Complicite at the National Theatre)

Third prize
Ben Whishaw, for Hamlet in Hamlet (Old Vic)

Commendations
Nikki Amuka-Bird, for Viola in Twelfth Night (Bristol Old Vic)
Elliot Cowan, for Rodrigo, Marquis of Posa in Don Carlos (Crucible Theatre, Sheffield)
Richard Glaves, for Marchbanks in Candida (Oxford Stage Company)
Jake Harders, for Reverend Alexander Mill in Candida (Oxford Stage Company)
Caroline Martin, for Desdemona in Othello (Cheek by Jowl)
David Nicolle, for Ion in Ion (Mercury Theatre, Colchester)
Matthew Rhys, for Edmund in King Lear (Royal Shakespeare Company)
Dan Stevens, for Orlando in As You Like It (Peter Hall Company)

2005
First prize
Mariah Gale, for Viola in Twelfth Night (Regent's Park Open Air Theatre), Annabella in Tis Pity She's a Whore (Southwark Playhouse), and Nurse Ludmilla and Klara in The Last Waltz (Arcola Theatre)

Second prize
Sinead Matthews, for Hedvig in The Wild Duck (Donmar Warehouse), and Dolly in You Never Can Tell (Peter Hall Company)

Third prize
Benedict Cumberbatch, for Tesman in Hedda Gabler (Almeida Theatre)

Commendations
Peter Bramhill, for Lifter and Lady Vanity in Thomas More (Royal Shakespeare Company)
Michelle Dockery, for Dina Dorf in Pillars of the Community (National Theatre)
Edward Hogg, for Woyzeck in Woyzeck (Gate Theatre)
Rory Kinnear, for Mortimer in Mary Stuart (Donmar Warehouse)
James Loye, for Cloten in Cymbeline, and Sir Andrew Aguecheek in Twelfth Night (Regent's Park Open Air Theatre)
Lyndsey Marshal, for Toinette in The Hypochondriac (Almeida Theatre)
Caitlin Mottram, for Helena in A Midsummer Night's Dream (Royal Shakespeare Company)
Nicholas Shaw, for Benjamin in Easter (Oxford Stage Company)

2006
First prize
Andrea Riseborough, for Isabella in Measure For Measure and Miss Julie in Miss Julie (Peter Hall Company)

Second prize
Catherine Hamilton, for Jessica in The Madras House (Orange Tree Theatre)

Third prize
Hattie Morahan, for Nina in The Seagull (National Theatre)

Commendations
Bryan Dick, for Dapper in The Alchemist (National Theatre)
Trystan Gravelle, for Young Shepherd in A Winter’s Tale (Royal Shakespeare Company)
Tom Hiddleston, for Alsemero in The Changeling (Cheek by Jowl)
Sally Leonard, for Lipochka in A Family Affair (Arcola Theatre)
Laura Rees, for Lavinia in Titus Andronicus (Shakespeare's Globe)
Amit Shah, for Abel Drugger in The Alchemist (National Theatre)
Lex Shrapnel, for John, Talbot’s son; Ghost of John Talbot; Henry, Earl of Richmond; and Son that killed his father in Henry VI (Royal Shakespeare Company)
Ony Uhiara, for Marina in Pericles (Royal Shakespeare Company)
Jodie Whittaker, for Nadya in Enemies (Almeida Theatre)

2007
First prize
Rory Kinnear, for Pytor in Philistines and Sir Fopling Flutter in The Man of Mode (National Theatre)Kinnear Follows Olivier With Ian Charleson Award 

Second prize
Michelle Dockery, for Eliza Doolittle in Pygmalion (Peter Hall Company)

Third prize
Tom Hiddleston, for Cassio in Othello (Donmar Warehouse)

Commendations
Edward Bennett, for Dick Gurvil in Nan, Victor Bretherton in Diana of Dobson's (Orange Tree Theatre); Freddy in Pygmalion (Peter Hall Company); and Roderigo in Othello (Donmar Warehouse)
Sam Crane, for Oswald in Ghosts (Bristol Old Vic), and Roderigo in Othello (Shakespeare's Globe)
Gabriel Fleary, for Alonso in The Changling (English Touring Theatre) 
Harry Hadden-Paton, for Mercutio in Romeo and Juliet (Battersea Arts Centre), and John Worthing in The Importance of Being Earnest (Theatre Royal Bath) 
Daniel Hawksford, for Claudio in Much Ado About Nothing (National Theatre) 
John Heffernan, for Oswald in King Lear (Royal Shakespeare Company) 
Richard Madden, for Romeo in Romeo and Juliet (Shakespeare's Globe touring) 
Carey Mulligan, for Nina in The Seagull (Royal Court Theatre) 
Pippa Nixon, for Jessica in The Merchant of Venice (Shakespeare's Globe) 
Amy Noble, for Lily Wilson in Chains (Orange Tree Theatre) 
Claudia Renton, for Mabel Chiltern in An Ideal Husband (Royal Exchange Theatre, Manchester) 
Dominic Tighe, for the Tailor and the Widow in The Taming of the Shrew (Propeller at the Watermill) 
Tom Vaughan-Lawlor, for the Dauphin in Henry V (Royal Exchange Theatre, Manchester)

2008
First prize
Tom Burke, for Adolph in Creditors (Donmar Warehouse)

Second prize
Edward Bennett, for Hamlet in Hamlet, and Navarre in Love's Labour's Lost  (Royal Shakespeare Company)

Third prize
John Heffernan, for Stephen Undershaft in Major Barbara (National Theatre)

Special commendations
Mariah Gale, for Ophelia in Hamlet (Royal Shakespeare Company) 
Tom Hiddleston, for Lvov in Ivanov (Donmar West End at Wyndhams Theatre)
Andrea Riseborough, for Sasha in Ivanov (Donmar West End at Wyndhams Theatre)

Commendations
Charles Aitken, for Iago in Othello (Frantic Assembly) 
David Ajala, for Reynaldo in Hamlet, and Cobweb in A Midsummer Night's Dream (Royal Shakespeare Company)
Hayley Atwell, for Barbara in Major Barbara (National Theatre) 
Beth Cooke, for Irina in Three Sisters (Royal Exchange Theatre, Manchester)
Tom Davey, for Laertes in Hamlet (Royal Shakespeare Company)
Natalie Dew, for Viola in Twelfth Night (Regent's Park Open Air Theatre)
Ryan Gage, for Flute in A Midsummer Night’s Dream (Royal Shakespeare Company) 
Oliver Le Sueur, for Lucentio The Taming of the Shrew and Laertes in Hamlet (Shakespeare at the Tobacco Factory, Bristol) 
Gwilym Lee, for the Messenger in Oedipus (National Theatre) 
Ella Smith, for Jaquenetta in Loves Labour's Lost (Rose Theatre) 
Alex Waldmann, for Sebastian in Twelfth Night (Donmar West End at Wyndhams Theatre)

2009
First prize
Ruth Negga, for Aricia in Phèdre (National Theatre)

Second prize
Max Bennett, for Claudio in Measure for Measure (Theatre Royal, Plymouth) and Frank in Mrs Warren's Profession (Theatre Royal, Bath)

Third prize
Natalie Dew, for Celia in As You Like It (Curve Theatre)

Special commendations as previous winners
Mariah Gale, for Celia in As You Like It (Royal Shakespeare Company) 
Rebecca Hall, for Hermione in The Winter’s Tale (Bridge Project at the Old Vic)

Commendations
Hedydd Dylan, for Eliza Doolittle in Pygmalion (Clwyd Theatr Cymru) 
Tracy Ifeachor, for Rosalind in As You Like It (Curve Theatre) 
Max Irons, for Max Piccolomini in Wallenstein (Chichester Festival Theatre) 
Tunji Kasim, for Lucius and Romulus in Julius Caesar (Royal Shakespeare Company)
Vanessa Kirby, for Regina in Ghosts (Octagon Theatre, Bolton)
Keira Knightley, for Jennifer in The Misanthrope (Comedy Theatre) 
Jack Laskey, for Orlando in As You Like It (Shakespeare's Globe) 
Harry Lloyd, for Oswald in Ghosts (Arcola Theatre) 
John MacMillan, for Malcolm in Macbeth (Royal Exchange Theatre), and Rosencrantz in Hamlet (Wyndhams Theatre) 
David Ononokpono, for Orlando in As You Like It (Curve Theatre) 
Henry Pettigrew, for Marcellus and Second Gravedigger in Hamlet (Wyndhams Theatre) 
Prasanna Puwanarajah, for Messenger in Thyestes (Arcola Theatre) 
George Rainsford, for Bertram in All’s Well That Ends Well (National Theatre) 
Sam Swainsbury, for Demetrius in A Midsummer Night’s Dream, and Salerio in The Merchant of Venice (Propeller) 
Ellie Turner, for Agnes in The School for Wives (Upstairs at the Gatehouse)

2010s
2010
First prize
Gwilym Lee, for Edgar in King Lear (Donmar Warehouse)

Second prize
Zawe Ashton, for Salome in Salome (Headlong Theatre)

Third prize
Vanessa Kirby, for Isabella in Women Beware Women (National Theatre), Rosalind in As You Like It (West Yorkshire Playhouse), and Helena in A Midsummer Night’s Dream (Octagon Theatre)

Commendations
Pippa Bennett-Warner, for Cordelia in King Lear (Donmar Warehouse) 
Natalie Dormer, for Mitzi in Sweet Nothings (Young Vic)
Susannah Fielding, for Petra in An Enemy of the People (Crucible Theatre, Sheffield)
Melody Grove, for Gwendolen in The Importance of Being Earnest (Royal Lyceum Theatre, Edinburgh)
Cush Jumbo, for Eliza Doolittle in Pygmalion (Royal Exchange Theatre, Manchester)
Ferdinand Kingsley, for Rosencrantz in Hamlet (National Theatre)
James McArdle, for Malcolm in Macbeth (Shakespeare's Globe), and Aleksey in A Month in the Country (Chichester Festival Theatre)
Jessica Raine, for Regina in Ghosts (Duchess Theatre)
Catrin Stewart, for Hilde in The Lady from the Sea (Royal Exchange Theatre, Manchester)
Joseph Timms, for John of Lancaster in Henry IV Parts 1 and 2 (Shakespeare's Globe)
Charity Wakefield, for Lydio Languish in The Rivals (Southwark Playhouse)
Ashley Zhangazha, for the King of France in King Lear (Donmar Warehouse)

2011
First prize
Cush Jumbo, for Rosalind in As You Like It (Royal Exchange Theatre, Manchester)"Winners and Nominees of the Ian Charleson Awards 2011". WestEndTheatre.com. 30 June 2012.

Second prize
Damien Molony, for Giovanni in 'Tis Pity She's a Whore (West Yorkshire Playhouse)

Third prize
Jodie McNee, for Masha in The Seagull (Arcola Theatre)

Commendations
Hiran Abeysekera, for Valère in Tartuffe (English Touring Theatre)
Jade Anouka, for Ophelia in Hamlet (Shakespeare's Globe)
Mark Arends, for Malcolm in Macbeth (Liverpool Everyman)
Sebastian Armesto, for Wendoll in A Woman Killed with Kindness (National Theatre)
John Heffernan, for Richard II in Richard II (Shakespeare at the Tobacco Factory)
Ffion Jolly, for Luciana in The Comedy of Errors (Shakespeare at the Tobacco Factory)
Ben Mansfield, for Sebastian in Twelfth Night (National Theatre)
Sam Marks, for Friar Peter, Froth, and Gentleman 2 in Measure for Measure (Royal Shakespeare Company)
Matthew Needham, for Nero in Britannicus (Wilton's Music Hall)
Eddie Redmayne, for Richard II in Richard II (Donmar Warehouse)
Lara Rossi, for Myrrha and Macrina in Emperor and Galilean (National Theatre)
Sara Vickers, for Annabella in 'Tis Pity She's a Whore (West Yorkshire Playhouse)

2012
First prize
Ashley Zhangazha, for Ross in Macbeth (Crucible Theatre, Sheffield)

Second prize
Amy Morgan, for Margery Pinchwife in The Country Wife (Royal Exchange Theatre, Manchester)

Third prize
Lara Rossi, for Dol Common in The Alchemist (Liverpool Playhouse)

Commendations
Jade Anouka, for Calpurnia, Metellus Cimber, and Pindarus in Julius Caesar (Donmar Warehouse)"Stars in their eyes". The Sunday Times. 5 May 2013.
Alys Daroy, for Yelena in The Wood Demon (Theatre Collection)
Holly Earl, for Bertha in The Father (Belgrade Theatre, Coventry)
Kurt Egyiawan, for Arsace in Berenice (Donmar Warehouse)
Paapa Essiedu, for Fenton in The Merry Wives of Windsor (Royal Shakespeare Company)
Johnny Flynn, for Viola in Twelfth Night (Shakespeare's Globe and West End)
Aysha Kala, for Maid in Much Ado About Nothing (Royal Shakespeare Company)
Vanessa Kirby, for Masha in Three Sisters (Young Vic)
Simon Manyonda, for Lucius in Julius Caesar (Royal Shakespeare Company)
Luke Norris, for The Soldier in Antigone (National Theatre)
Ailish Symons, for Cecily in The Importance of Being Earnest (Lyric Theatre, Belfast)
Ellie Turner, for Fanny Hawthorn in Hindle Wakes (Finborough Theatre)

2013
First prize
Jack Lowden, for Oswald in Ghosts (Almeida Theatre)"Jack Lowden Wins Ian Charleson Award". WestEndTheatre.com. 27 April 2014."Jessie Buckley, Jack Lowden and Olivia Vinall among Ian Charleson shortlist". WhatsOnStage.com. 24 March 2014.

Second prize
Jessie Buckley, for Miranda in The Tempest (Shakespeare's Globe) and Princess Katharine in Henry V (Noël Coward Theatre)

Third prize
Graham Butler, for Henry VI in Henry VI, Parts I, II & III (Shakespeare's Globe)

Commendations
Fisayo Akinade, for Adam, Silvius, and William in As You Like It (Transport Theatre on tour)
Elliot Barnes-Worrell, for the Groom in Richard II (Royal Shakespeare Company)
Nari Blair-Mangat, for Caithness in Macbeth (Manchester International Festival)
Gavin Fowler, for Puck in A Midsummer Night's Dream (Noël Coward Theatre) and Florizel in The Winter's Tale (Royal Shakespeare Company)
Kim Hardy, for Konstantin in The Seagull (The White Bear)
Brian Markey, for Hugh in Mixed Marriage (Lyric Theatre, Belfast)
Charlene McKenna, for Regina in Ghosts (Almeida Theatre)
Rose Reynolds, for Lavinia in Titus Andronicus (Royal Shakespeare Company)
Gemma Soul, for Rose in The Recruiting Officer (Salisbury Playhouse)
Luke Thompson, for Lysander in A Midsummer Night's Dream (Shakespeare's Globe)
Olivia Vinall, for Desdemona in Othello (National Theatre)

2014
First prize
Susannah Fielding, for Portia in The Merchant of Venice (Almeida Theatre)Snow, Georgia. "Susannah Fielding wins Ian Charleson award". The Stage. 19 June 2015.

Second prize
Tom Mothersdale, for Yasha in The Cherry Orchard (Young Vic)

Third prize
Cynthia Erivo, for Poins and Earl of Douglas in Henry IV (Donmar Warehouse)

Commendations
Stefano Braschi, for Soranzo in 'Tis Pity She's a Whore (Sam Wanamaker Playhouse, Shakespeare's Globe)
Rebecca Collingwood, for Blanche in Widowers' Houses (Orange Tree Theatre)
Ncuti Gatwa, for Mercutio in Romeo and Juliet (HOME, Manchester)
Emma Hall, for Phaedra, Aphrodite, and Artemis in Hippolytos (Antic Face, at The Colepit)
Jennifer Kirby, for Lady Percy in Henry IV Parts 1 and 2 (Royal Shakespeare Company)
Daisy May, for Celia in As You Like It (Tobacco Factory Theatre, Bristol)
Frances McNamee, for Finea in A Lady of Little Sense (Theatre Royal, Bath)
Ekow Quartey, for Hans in Spring Awakening (touring production by Headlong/West Yorkshire Playhouse/Nuffield Theatre)
Michael Shelford, for Willie Mossop in Hobson's Choice (Octagon Theatre, Bolton)
Thalissa Teixeira, for Chorus in Electra (Old Vic)

2015
First prize
James McArdle, for Platonov in Platonov (Chichester Festival Theatre)Snow, Georgia. "James McArdle wins 2015 Ian Charleson award". The Stage. 24 June 2016.

Second prize
Elliot Barnes-Worrell, for Straker in Man and Superman (National Theatre)

Third prize
Freddie Fox, for Romeo in Romeo and Juliet (Sheffield Crucible)

Commendations
Joel MacCormack, for Orestes in The Oresteia (Shakespeare's Globe)"Ian Charleson Awards – Nominations 2015". WestEndTheatre.com. 17 May 2016.
Ken Nwosu, for Silvius in As You Like It (National Theatre)
Jack Colgrave Hirst, for Clown in The Winter’s Tale (Kenneth Branagh Theatre Company at the Garrick Theatre)
Joshua James, for Konstantin in The Seagull and Nikolai in Platonov (Chichester Festival Theatre)
Emily Barber, for Imogen in Cymbeline (Shakespeare's Globe)
Jenny Rainsford, for Miss Prue in Love for Love (Royal Shakespeare Company)
Jessica Baglow, for Marina in Pericles (Shakespeare's Globe)
Jessica Brown Findlay, for Elektra in The Oresteia (Almeida Theatre and Trafalgar Studios)

2016
First prize
Paapa Essiedu, for Hamlet in Hamlet and Edmund in King Lear (Royal Shakespeare Company)Snow, Georgia.
 "Paapa Essiedu wins 2016 Ian Charleson award". The Stage. 6 June 2017.

Second prize
Jessica Brown Findlay, for Sonya in Uncle Vanya (Almeida Theatre)

Third prize
Fisayo Akinade, for The Dauphin in Saint Joan (Donmar Warehouse)

Commendations
James Corrigan, for Palamon in The Two Noble Kinsmen (Royal Shakespeare Company)
Emma Curtis, for The Lady in Comus (Shakespeare's Globe)
Marcus Griffiths, for Laertes in Hamlet (Royal Shakespeare Company)
Felicity Huxley-Miners, for Elena Popova in The Bear (The London Theatre – New Cross)
Francesca Mills, for Maria in The Government Inspector (Birmingham Repertory Theatre)
Marc Rhys, for Christian in Cyrano de Bergerac (Theatr Clwyd)
Natalie Simpson, for Cordelia in King Lear, Ophelia in Hamlet, and Guideria in Cymbeline (Royal Shakespeare Company)
Ewan Somers, for Claudio in Much Ado About Nothing (Dundee Repertory Theatre)
Marli Siu, for Hero in Much Ado About Nothing (Dundee Repertory Theatre)
Joanna Vanderham, for Queen Anne in Richard III (Almeida Theatre)
Paksie Vernon, for Sylvia Craven in The Philanderer (Orange Tree Theatre)

2017
First prize
Natalie Simpson, for Duchess Rosaura in The Cardinal (Southwark Playhouse)

Second prize
Tamara Lawrance, for Viola in Twelfth Night (National Theatre)

Third prize
Ellie Bamber, for Hilde in The Lady from the Sea (Donmar Warehouse)

Commendations
Daniel Ezra, for Sebastian in Twelfth Night (National Theatre)
Rebecca Lee, for Friar Laurence in Romeo and Juliet (Watermill Theatre, Newbury)
James Corrigan, for Mark Antony in Julius Caesar (Royal Shakespeare Company)
Ned Derrington, for Lysander in A Midsummer Night's Dream (Shakespeare's Globe)
Sope Dirisu, for Coriolanus in Coriolanus (Royal Shakespeare Company)
Arthur Hughes, for Lucius in Julius Caesar (Sheffield Crucible)
Douggie McMeekin, for Snug in A Midsummer Night's Dream (Young Vic)
Hannah Morrish, for Lavinia in Titus Andronicus (Royal Shakespeare Company)

2018
First prize
Bally Gill, for Romeo in Romeo and Juliet (Royal Shakespeare Company)

Second prize
Hannah Morrish, for Octavia in Antony and Cleopatra (National Theatre)

Third prize
Luke Newberry, for Malcolm in Macbeth (Royal Shakespeare Company)

Commendations
Daniel Burke, for Diomed in Troilus and Cressida (Royal Shakespeare Company)Snow, Georgia. "Tyrone Huntley among nominees for 2018 Ian Charleson Awards". The Stage. 18 March 2019.
Heledd Gwynn, for Katharine and Dauphin in Henry V (Tobacco Factory Theatre, Bristol)
Tyrone Huntley, for Lysander in A Midsummer Night's Dream (Watermill Theatre, Newbury)
Martins Imhangbe, for Bagot and Aumerle in Richard II (Almeida Theatre)
Toheeb Jimoh, for Demetrius in A Midsummer Night's Dream (Crucible Theatre, Sheffield)
Aaron Pierre, for Cassio in Othello (Shakespeare's Globe)
Ellora Torchia, for Emilia in Two Noble Kinsmen (Shakespeare's Globe)
Helena Wilson, for Mariana in Measure for Measure (Donmar Warehouse)

2019
First prize
Heledd Gwynn, for Hedda in Hedda Gabler (Sherman Theatre, Cardiff) and Hastings and Ratcliffe in Richard III (Headlong)Bosanquet, Theo. "Winners announced of 30th Ian Charleson awards". WhatsOnStage.com. 29 March 2021.

Second prize
Hammed Animashaun, for Bottom in A Midsummer Night's Dream (Bridge Theatre)

Third prize
Ronke Adekoluejo, for Abosede in Three Sisters (National Theatre)

Commendations
Kitty Archer, for Mariane in Tartuffe (National Theatre)
Eben Figueiredo, for Christian in Cyrano de Bergerac (Jamie Lloyd Company at the Playhouse Theatre)
Isis Hainsworth, for Hermia in A Midsummer Night's Dream (Bridge Theatre)
Ebony Jonelle, for Rosalind in As You Like It (National Theatre Public Acts at the Queen's Theatre, Hornchurch)
Ioanna Kimbook, for Cariola in The Duchess of Malfi (Almeida Theatre)
Racheal Ofori, for Udo in Three Sisters (National Theatre)
Billy Postlethwaite, for Macbeth in Macbeth (Watermill Theatre)
Ekow Quartey, for Lysander in A Midsummer Night's Dream (Shakespeare's Globe)
Kit Young, for Lysander in A Midsummer Night's Dream (Bridge Theatre)

2020s
2020
First prize
Gloria Obianyo, for Neoptolemus in Kae Tempest's Paradise (National Theatre)

Second prize
Aimee Lou Wood, for Sonya in Uncle Vanya (Harold Pinter Theatre)

Third prize
Lorn Macdonald, for Segismundo in Life Is a Dream (Royal Lyceum Theatre, Edinburgh)

Commendations
Jonathan Ajayi, for Laertes in Hamlet (Young Vic)
Norah Lopez Holden, for Ophelia in Hamlet (Young Vic)
Baker Mukasa, for Angelo in The Comedy of Errors (Royal Shakespeare Company)
Rebekah Murrell, for Juliet in Romeo and Juliet (Shakespeare's Globe)
Anna Russell-Martin, for Rosaura in Life Is a Dream (Royal Lyceum Theatre, Edinburgh)
Josh Zaré, for Claudio in Measure for Measure (Shakespeare's Globe)

Judges
1990s
1990
John Peter – Sunday Times drama critic
Ian Brown – drama director of the Arts Council of Great Britain
Sylvia Syms – actress

1991
John Peter – Sunday Times drama critic
Ian Brown – drama director of the Arts Council of Great Britain
Sylvia Syms – actress

1992
John Peter – Sunday Times drama critic
Ian Brown – drama director of the Arts Council of Great Britain
Sylvia Syms – actress

1993
John Peter – Sunday Times drama critic
Jane Lapotaire – actress
Nicholas Wright – playwright and director

1994
Serena Hill – National Theatre casting director
Jane Lapotaire – actress
Nicholas Wright – National Theatre associate director
John Peter – Sunday Times drama critic

1995
Serena Hill – National Theatre casting director
Jane Lapotaire – actress
Nicholas Wright – National Theatre associate director
John Peter – Sunday Times drama critic

1996
Jane Lapotaire – actress
Serena Hill – National Theatre casting director
John Peter – Sunday Times drama critic

1997
Peter Gill – playwright and director
Serena Hill – National Theatre casting director
John Peter – Sunday Times drama critic

1998
Penelope Wilton – actress
Peter Gill – playwright and director
Wendy Spon – National Theatre deputy casting director
John Peter – Sunday Times drama critic

1999(unpublished)2000s
2000
Penelope Wilton – actress
Peter Gill – playwright and director
Wendy Spon – National Theatre deputy casting director
John Peter – Sunday Times drama critic

2001
Penelope Wilton – actress
Howard Davies – National Theatre associate director
John Peter – Sunday Times drama critic

2002
Eileen Atkins – actress
Howard Davies – National Theatre associate director
Gabrielle Dawes – National Theatre casting director
Hannah Miller – National Theatre casting director
John Peter – Sunday Times drama critic

2003
Lindsay Posner – director
Penny Downie – actress
Toby Whale –  head of casting at the National Theatre
John Peter – Sunday Times drama critic

2004(unpublished)2005
Francesca Annis – actress
Lindsay Posner – director
Toby Whale – National Theatre casting director
John Peter – Sunday Times drama critic

2006
Francesca Annis – actress
Lindsay Posner – director
Toby Whale – National Theatre casting director
John Peter – Sunday Times drama critic

2007
Penny Downie – actress
Michael Grandage – director
Wendy Spon – National Theatre casting director
John Peter – Sunday Times drama critic

2008(unpublished)2009
Wendy Spon – National Theatre head of casting
Geraldine James – actress
Michael Grandage – director
John Peter – Sunday Times drama critic

2010s
2010
Geraldine James – actress
Michael Grandage – director
Alastair Coomer – National Theatre casting director 
John Peter – Sunday Times drama critic

2011(unpublished)2012
Michael Grandage – director
Geraldine James – actress
Wendy Spon – National Theatre head of casting
John Peter – former Sunday Times drama critic

2013
Michael Grandage – director
Francesca Annis – actress
Wendy Spon – National Theatre head of casting
John Peter – former Sunday Times drama critic

2014
Michael Grandage – director
Francesca Annis – actress
Wendy Spon – National Theatre head of casting
John Peter – former Sunday Times drama critic

2015
Michael Grandage – director
Deborah Findlay – actress
Wendy Spon – National Theatre head of casting
John Peter – former Sunday Times drama critic

2016
Michael Grandage – director
Deborah Findlay – actress
Wendy Spon – National Theatre head of casting

2017
Michael Grandage – director
Deborah Findlay – actress
Wendy Spon – National Theatre head of casting

2018
Michael Grandage – director
Deborah Findlay – actress
Wendy Spon – National Theatre head of casting
Kate Bassett – The Times theatre critic and literary associate at Chichester Festival Theatre

2019
Lyndsey Turner – director
Deborah Findlay – actress 
Alastair Coomer – casting director
Kate Bassett – The Times theatre critic and literary associate at Chichester Festival Theatre

2020s
2020
Emma Fielding – actress
Ashley Zhangazha – actress
Alastair Coomer – National Theatre casting director
Kate Bassett – former theatre critic at The Times''

See also
List of Ian Charleson Award winners
Sam Wanamaker Prize

References

 
Awards established in 1990
British theatre awards
Theatre acting awards
Awards for classical theatre
1990 establishments in the United Kingdom
Early career awards